Serena Waldman (born 1984), is a person with cerebral palsy. She became famous as a young adult when a company dedicated to the transport of disabled people began to sponsor her father's wheelchair-accessible hot air balloon, which was named after her.

Background
Waldman experienced severe complications during birth, including not breathing for nearly 21 minutes. She spent an extended stay in hospital after birth, followed by a period of therapies and multiple medical visits.

Her father, Gary Waldman, received an invitation by Phil Gray, a friend and hot air balloon pilot, to take a ride in a hot air balloon in 1986. Waldman decided to take his then two-year-old daughter along with him. Unexpectedly to the balloon's riders, Serena reacted to the balloon ride in a positive way. This prompted her father to open a service where he could try to give the same experience to other disabled children.

Her father approached Phil Gray, Owner and Chief Engineer of National Ballooning Ltd. to construct the nation's first aircraft specifically made for disabled riders.  The Project meant so much to the Gray family that Phil and Gary Partnered and at completion of manufacturing the balloon was named, "Serena's Song", after Waldman's his daughter. It is believed to be the first hot air balloon in the world to be specially modified so that people in wheelchairs can fly in it.

Gary and Phil traveled across the United States and to Canada to fairs and other events, where they could give disabled people the experience of flying in a hot air balloon. Their story became nationally known, as many television channels and other types of media covered them.

The Balloon Continues to fly, now in Gary's Memory, it is still piloted and owned by its creator, Phil Gray. The with the single goal of letting disabled people, their loved ones, friends and caretakers experience flight in a hot air balloon.

References

External links
Veolia's website on Serena's Song

American balloonists
Living people
1984 births
American people with disabilities
American women balloonists
21st-century American women